William Little (August 8, 1809 – August 26, 1887) was mayor of Pittsburgh, in the US state of Pennsylvania, from 1839 to 1840.

Early life
Little was born in Pittsburgh, Pennsylvania, in 1809. Early in his life, he belonged to the civic/vigilance committee The Duquesne Greys.

Later life
After leaving the mayor's office he entered the private sector, developing a canal freight business in Ohio before moving further west and starting a successful furniture company in Iowa.

By the middle of the century he returned to Pittsburgh to manage the Monongahela Navigation Company. He was also treasurer of a local Pittsburgh bank.

He died in 1887 in Pittsburgh, aged 78, and is buried in Allegheny Cemetery.

External links
William Little entry at The Political Graveyard

1809 births
1887 deaths
Burials at Allegheny Cemetery
Canal executives
Mayors of Pittsburgh
19th-century American politicians
19th-century American businesspeople